is a Japanese footballer who plays for NJ/NY Gotham FC. A full international since 2008, she won gold at the 2011 World Cup as well as silver at the 2012 London Olympics and 2015 World Cup. During the 2011 World Cup, she scored two goals—including a lob at 35 yards away against Sweden during the semifinals—helping Japan eventually win the tournament for the first time in its history.

Early life
Kawasumi was raised in Kanagawa Prefecture about 40 minutes south of Tokyo where she began playing soccer as a youth following the lead of her older sister. She played for the Rinkan Lemons while in elementary school along with future Japanese national team defender Megumi Kamionobe. Kawasumi and Kamionobe scored approximately 70% of the team's goals. Kawasumi attended Nippon Sport Science University.

Club career

INAC Kobe Leonessa 
Kawasumi signed with INAC Kobe Leonessa in 2008. In 2011, she was named the league's most valuable player after captaining INAC to its first league championship title. The team finished the 2011 season with a 12–3–0 record and 39 points.

During the 2013 season, Kawasumi was named the league's most valuable player for a second time. Her twelve goals were second only to her teammate Beverly Goebel. She was also named to the league's Best Eleven team for the fourth year in a row. INAC finished first in the league with a 16–0–2 record securing their third championship in three consecutive years. Their 48 points were 10 more than second place team Nippon TV Beleza.

During the 2013 International Women's Club Championship, Kawasumi scored INAC's second goal during their 3–0 semi-final win against Chilean team, Colo-Colo Femenino. INAC Kobe won the tournament with a 4–2 win over Chelsea L.F.C. in the final.

In September 2014, Kawasumi returned to INAC Kobe Leonessa after she finished the 2014 NWSL season for Seattle Reign FC on loan.

Seattle Reign FC (loan) 
In February 2014, Kawasumi signed with Seattle Reign FC on loan for the 2014 National Women's Soccer League season. After scoring two goals including the game-winning goal against the Boston Breakers to lift Seattle to a 3–2 win on 6 July 2014, Kawasumi was named NWSL Player of the Week. A few weeks later during a match against the 2013 champions Portland Thorns FC, Kawasumi scored two goals and served an assist to help the Reign win 5–0. She was subsequently named NWSL Player of the Week for the second time during week 16 of the season. Kawasumi finished the 2014 season, having scored 9 goals and provided 5 assists. And she was selected to the NWSL Best XI for the 2014 Season.

Seattle Reign FC 
In June 2016, Kawasumi re-signed with NWSL club Seattle Reign FC. Kawasumi scored a brace on her debut against the Boston Breakers just days after re-signing, earning her NWSL Player of the Week honors. Despite her efforts, the Reign finished fifth in the 2016 NWSL season, missing the play-offs for the first time in three years. Kawasumi played in all ten matches for the Reign after re-signing, starting eight and scoring three goals.

On 13 May 2017, Kawasumi set a new NWSL single-game record with four assists in a 6–2 win over the Washington Spirit. She continued her good run of form in the rest of the 2017 season, playing in all 24 games and scoring six goals. Despite her contribution, Seattle again finished fifth and missed the play-offs.

Following the arrival of new head coach Vlatko Andonovski, Kawasumi saw her playing time diminish and finished the 2018 season scoreless. During the offseason, Kawasumi asked for a trade to maximize her playing time ahead of the 2019 FIFA Women's World Cup and the 2020 Summer Olympics in her home country.

INAC Kobe Leonessa (loan) 
Following the conclusion of 2016 NWSL season, Kawasumi signed with former club INAC Kobe Leonessa on loan for the rest of its 2016 L.League season. She helped the club win the 2016 Empress's Cup despite not playing in the final.

NJ/NY Gotham FC 
On 15 January 2019, Seattle Reign FC traded Kawasumi to fellow NWSL club Sky Blue FC (later NJ/NY Gotham FC) in exchange for American forward Shea Groom.

International career

Senior 
Kawasumi began playing for the Japan national team, also known as Nadeshiko Japan, in 2008. She scored her first international goal against Finland at the 2011 Algarve Cup.

During the semi-final match of the 2011 World Cup against Sweden, Kawasumi scored two goals helping Japan win 3–1 and advance to the final against the United States. Kawasumi was in the starting line-up for the first time during the game and scored the equalizer in the 18th minute and the game-winning goal in the 64th. Japan eventually defeated the United States in penalty kicks to clinch the gold medal.

Kawasumi was named to Japan's roster for the 2012 London Olympics and scored her first goal of the tournament during the team' first group stage match against Canada. Japan defeated Canada 2–1. Japan finished second in their group after tying both Sweden and South Africa 0–0. After defeating Brazil 2–0 in the quarter-finals, Japan faced France in the semi-finals and won 2–1 advancing to the final. The team was defeated 2–1 by the United States in the final earning Japan a silver medal at the tournament. Kawasumi finished the tournament having played in every match for Japan and scoring one goal.

Kawasumi remained an integral part of the Nadeshiko side, helping the team finish runners-up in the 2015 FIFA Women's World Cup. Her cross forced a last-minute own goal by English defender Laura Bassett and sent Japan into the final.

Following Japan's failed qualification to the 2016 Summer Olympics, new national team head coach Asako Takakura left off many veterans (including Kawasumi) in favor of younger players. However, Kawasumi was surprisingly recalled to the Nadeshiko in March 2018, following a two-year absence. Her experience helped the team lift the 2018 AFC Women's Asian Cup. Faced with a real chance to make Japan's 2019 FIFA Women's World Cup roster and with playing time diminished at Seattle Reign FC, Kawasumi requested a trade and joined Sky Blue FC in January 2019.

Off the pitch
Kawasumi has appeared in commercials for CalorieMate, Toyota, and skin care line Acnelogy.

Career statistics

Club

International

Scores and results list Japan's goal tally first, score column indicates score after each Kawasumi goal.

Honours
INAC Kobe Leonessa
Nadeshiko League: 2011, 2012, 2013

 Empress's Cup: 2010, 2011, 2012, 2013, 2015, 2016

Nadeshiko League Cup: 2013

International Women's Club Championship: 2013
Seattle Reign FC
NWSL Shield (regular season winners): 2014
Japan
FIFA Women's World Cup: 2011
FIFA Women's World Cup Runner-Up: 2015

Olympic Games Silver Medal: 2012

AFC Women's Asian Cup: 2014, 2018

 Asian Games: 2010

 Summer Universiade: 2005
Individual
Japan Women's Football League
MVP: 2011, 2013
Top Scorers (1): 2011
Best XI: 2010, 2011, 2012, 2013

NWSL
Player of the Week: Week 13, Week 16 (2014 season); Week 11 (2016 season); Week 5 (2017 season)
Best XI: 2014

References

External links

 
 

Japan Football Association
  – Kawasumi's Official Blog (Japanese)
 Seattle Reign player profile

1985 births
Living people
People from Yamato, Kanagawa
Asian Games gold medalists for Japan
Asian Games silver medalists for Japan
Asian Games medalists in football
Association football people from Kanagawa Prefecture
Expatriate women's soccer players in the United States
FIFA Women's World Cup-winning players
Footballers at the 2010 Asian Games
Footballers at the 2012 Summer Olympics
Footballers at the 2014 Asian Games
INAC Kobe Leonessa players
Japan women's international footballers
Japanese women's footballers
Japanese expatriate footballers
Japanese expatriate sportspeople in the United States
Nadeshiko League players
Medalists at the 2010 Asian Games
Medalists at the 2014 Asian Games
Medalists at the 2012 Summer Olympics
National Women's Soccer League players
Nippon Sport Science University alumni
Olympic footballers of Japan
Olympic silver medalists for Japan
Olympic medalists in football
OL Reign players
Women's association football forwards
Women's association football midfielders
2011 FIFA Women's World Cup players
2015 FIFA Women's World Cup players
NJ/NY Gotham FC players
Nadeshiko League MVPs